The blue-spotted woodlizard (Enyalioides praestabilis) is a species of reptile in the genus Enyalioides, native to Colombia, Ecuador, and Peru.

References 

Reptiles of Colombia
Reptiles of Ecuador
Reptiles of Peru
Lizards of South America
Reptiles described in 1881
Enyalioides
Taxa named by Arthur William Edgar O'Shaughnessy